Marko Andrijić (c. 1470 - after 1507) was a stonemason from the Republic of Ragusa and one of the great master builders of the 15th and 16th-century. His son, Petar Andrijić (c. 1492-1553), was also a stonemason.

Many ornamental carvings in Korčula and elsewhere are attributed to Marko Andrijić. He also introduced some transitional Renaissance features in his work.

See also
 List of architects

References 

People from the Republic of Ragusa
Stonemasons
15th-century births
16th-century deaths